Polyplacapros tyleri is a species of deepwater boxfish native to the southwestern Pacific Ocean where it is found near Australia, New Zealand and the sea mounts of the Norfolk Ridge at a depth of around . This species is the only known member of its genus.

References

Aracanidae
Fish described in 1979